Kordon is a rural locality (a settlement) in Kosinskoye Rural Settlement, Kosinsky District, Perm Krai, Russia. The population was 1,100 as of 2010. There are 17 streets.

Geography 
It is located 3 km north-east from Kosa.

References 

Rural localities in Kosinsky District